Acacia georgensis, commonly known as Bega wattle or Dr George Mountain wattle, is a species of Acacia native to southeastern Australia. It was one of eleven species selected for the Save a Species Walk campaign in April 2016 when scientists walked 300 km to raise money for collection of seeds to be prepared and stored at the Australian PlantBank at the Australian Botanic Garden Mount Annan.

Description
The brown or grey coloured bark has a corrugated to furrowed texture that can be or deeply fissured. It has glabrous and terete branchlets that are angular but can be compressed at extremities and is usually covered in a fine white powdery coating. Like most species of Acacia it has phyllodes rather than true leaves. It blooms between August and October producing inflorescences which are found singly or in pairs in the axils and which have ovoid or cylindrical flower-heads with a length of  packed with bright yellow flowers. Following flowering firmly papery to thinly leathery seed pods form that are flat and straight but raised over and constricted between each of the seeds.

Distribution
It has a limited range in south eastern New South Wales from around Tathra and Bega in the north and extending down the Great Dividing Range to around Bemboka, the Yowrie River and Tuross River regions in the south. It is often situated on exposed rocky outcrops, slopes and ridges growing in thin soils over sandstone, conglomerate or granite as a part of scrub, heath or open dry sclerophyll forest communities.

See also
 List of Acacia species

References

georgensis
Fabales of Australia
Flora of New South Wales
Taxa named by Mary Tindale